Bernardo Cardoso de Resende Alves (born November 20, 1974, Belo Horizonte) is a show jumping rider from Brazil. He competed at the 2004 Summer Olympics and the 2008 Summer Olympics.

Early life 
He is the son of João Baptista Ribeiro de Resende Alves and Maria José Cardoso.  His interest in the sport of show jumping began at age four on a visit to a farm. He began to learn the sport at this age under the instruction of Joseph Wilson. His first attempts were troubled as he took many falls, but he was determined and his trainer saw in him a lot of potential. By the age of eight, his determination noticeably paid off, as he won his first title and graduated to the tutelage of Vitor Alves Teixeira. By the age of 16, he was competing in the professional class. In May 2001, he trained for three months at the school of Nelson Pessoa in Belgium. This prepared him for his debut at the CHIO Aachen.

Career highlights 
 2002
 Bronze medal for Brazil, World Championship of Young Horses
 2003
 Voted the best rider of the CSI-W Mechelen, Belgium
 3rd place in Grand Prix CSI-A La Coruna, Spain
 2004
 2nd place in the Grand Prix World Cup CSI-W Vigo, Spain
 1st place in Grand Prix CSI Bois-le-Roi, France
 Bronze Medal (team) at the Pan American Games
 1st place in the King's Cup CSI-A Madrid
 2nd place in Grand Prix CSI-A Monte Carlo
 1st place in the IXth Grand Prix CSI Vejer de la Frontera
 2009
 24–29 May: Winner of the Grand Prix of the Global Champions Tour's phase in Hamburg

References 

1974 births
Living people
Brazilian male equestrians
Sportspeople from Belo Horizonte
Equestrians at the 2007 Pan American Games
Equestrians at the 2011 Pan American Games
Pan American Games medalists in equestrian
Pan American Games silver medalists for Brazil
Pan American Games bronze medalists for Brazil
Olympic equestrians of Brazil
Equestrians at the 2004 Summer Olympics
Equestrians at the 2008 Summer Olympics
Medalists at the 2011 Pan American Games